Thomas Alfred Chapman (1867–1949) was an Anglican bishop in the first half of the twentieth century.

Life
Educated at Exeter College, Oxford, he was ordained in 1890 and  began his ecclesiastical career as a Curate at Charles Church, Plymouth. After this he was Vicar of St John, Carlisle and then Rural Dean of East Bristol. In 1899 he returned to Charles to be  Rural Dean of the Three Towns and then a decade later became Rural Dean of St Peter's, Bolton before an 11-year spell as Bishop of Colchester.

Notes

1867 births
Clergy from Staffordshire
Alumni of Exeter College, Oxford
Bishops of Colchester
1949 deaths
20th-century Church of England bishops